The 2008-09 Biathlon World Cup - World Cup 9 was the nine event of the World Cup season and was held in Khanty-Mansiysk, Russia, from Thursday March 26 until Sunday March 29, 2009.

Schedule of events
The schedule of the event is below

Event summary

Men

Women

References 

Biathlon World Cup - World Cup 9, 2008-09
2009 in Russian sport
Sport in Khanty-Mansiysk
Biathlon competitions in Russia
March 2009 sports events in Europe